Subham Mandal (born 23 August 1998) is an Indian cricketer. He made his first-class debut on 11 January 2020, for Assam in the 2019–20 Ranji Trophy.

References

External links
 

1998 births
Living people
Indian cricketers
Assam cricketers
Place of birth missing (living people)